South Dakota is the twenty-eighth richest state in the United States of America, with a per capita income of $26,959 (2010).

South Dakota counties by per capita income

Note: Data is from the 2010 United States Census Data and the 2006-2010 American Community Survey 5-Year Estimates.

South Dakota county subdivisions by per capita income

References

South Dakota
Economy of South Dakota
Income